LaserShip is a regional last-mile delivery company that services the Eastern and Midwest United States. Founded in 1986, LaserShip is based in Vienna, Virginia and has sorting centers in New Jersey, Ohio, North Carolina, and Florida.

As of 2016, LaserShip has 63 distribution centers and four sorting centers servicing 22 states and Washington, D.C., and handles deliveries for Amazon's Same Day Service.

In April 2019, LaserShip was awarded the International Supply Chain Protection Organization (ISCPO) Carrier Certification; the company has also achieved compliance with ISCPO Carrier Security Requirements.

LaserShip has been widely criticized for drivers roughly handling goods, including throwing and driving over packages. LaserShip drivers have also been reported for damaging and stealing the personal property of recipients. The company has been penalized by multiple governments for misclassifying drivers as independent contractors, and for delivering untaxed cigarettes (for which the company was prosecuted under the Racketeer Influenced and Corrupt Organizations Act).

In January 2022, the regional LaserShip delivery service had received more complaints to the Better Business Bureau than national carrier United Parcel Service (UPS).

History

LaserShip began as a document delivery service in 1986. In the 1990s, LaserShip landed in the small parcel business during the dot-com boom. In 1999, the company partnered with Barnes & Noble to provide same-day shipping services in New York City.

In March 2014, LaserShip added four states to its service area: New Hampshire, Rhode Island, West Virginia and Delaware. This expanded the LaserShip footprint by 44 percent, reaching an additional 8.5 million consumers. Also in March 2014, LaserShip acquired Cleveland-based last-mile delivery company Prestige Delivery Systems, further expanding services to Ohio, Kentucky, Michigan and Indiana.

In early 2018, the company was purchased by private equity firm Greenbriar Equity Group.

In May 2021, LaserShip expanded into Tennessee, opening three new branches in Memphis, Knoxville, and Nashville. This expansion added 979 new zip codes, an 18% increase of their delivery coverage.

Disputes and settlements

Package tossing, property damage, and theft

Numerous news reports backed up by surveillance camera footage depict LaserShip delivery drivers recklessly tossing packages onto customers' property. A New York magazine article entitled "LaserShip, Amazon's New Shipping Partner, Might Be the Most Hated Company on the Internet" features a compilation video showing numerous such incidents at over a dozen different households, with packages ending up on porches, in front lawns, and on driveways. In one incident from 2016, a LaserShip delivery man was caught on tape tossing a $500 camera lens several yards onto a poured-concrete porch. In March 2017, a customer caught on tape a delivery man tossing a package containing a router, damaging the contents, and reported the incident to LaserShip. After the complaint, the delivery man then returned to the customer's residence four times, prompting the customer to call the police. The customer spoke with the Vice President of LaserShip, who noted that the employee had been with the company for 10 years.

In February 2018, a LaserShip driver dumped a package onto the lawn of a Naples, Florida, resident before proceeding to run over an orange tree sapling in her front yard while quickly executing a three-point turn. The resident captured the incident on a surveillance camera and reported the story to WINK News.

At 5:19 PM on 7 July 2019, a LaserShip employee was caught on tape delivering a package and then stealing a Coach bag from the garage of the delivery destination containing $1,600 in electronics.

Misclassification and non-payment of drivers

In April 2014, the company reached a class-action settlement of $800,000 with drivers in Massachusetts who accused the company of misclassifying them as independent contractors.  In November 2015, a class action lawsuit was filed in the United States District Court for the Southern District of New York alleging that workers were denied overtime payments, were unlawfully denied earned compensation, and for other violations of the Fair Labor Standards Act.  The results of this litigation are pending.

In June 2019, LaserShip was ordered to pay almost $600,000 to drivers in New Jersey who had been classified as independent contractors after an investigation by the US Department of Labor.

Cigarette settlement
In September 2014, LaserShip reached a $5 million settlement with the city of New York over deliveries of untaxed cigarettes. The original suit alleged that LaserShip had delivered more than 120,000 cartons between 2011 and 2013 violating federal and state laws and resulting in tax losses of $1.9 million. The case was prosecuted under the Racketeer Influenced and Corrupt Organizations (RICO) Act. Under the settlement agreement, LaserShip ended all cigarette shipments.

References

Further reading
 "Macy's expands same day delivery to 17 cities as it challenges Amazon". Reuters.

Companies based in Virginia
Transport companies established in 1986
Logistics companies of the United States
Transportation companies based in Virginia